James Brooks Staton, Jr. (May 23, 1927 – September 16, 1993) was an American football defensive tackle in the National Football League for the Washington Redskins.  He played college football at Wake Forest University and was drafted in the second round of the 1951 NFL Draft.

His greatest success came in Canadian football as a member of the Montreal Alouettes, where he played for five seasons (49 regular season games) and was selected an All-Star twice.

References

1927 births
1993 deaths
People from Ansonville, North Carolina
American football defensive tackles
Wake Forest Demon Deacons football players
Washington Redskins players
Montreal Alouettes players
Players of Canadian football from North Carolina
Players of American football from Greensboro, North Carolina
Grimsley High School alumni